"Re-act" is Olivia's second solo single released on May 12, 1999. It was used in commercials for Kanebo Cosmetics' Kate range, which featured Olivia as a spokesperson. The music video was shot on April 17, 1999.

Track listing
 Re-act
 Rolling Stone
 Re-act (Instrumental)
 Rolling Stone (Instrumental)

References

1999 singles
Olivia Lufkin songs
Song recordings produced by T2ya
Songs written by T2ya
1999 songs
Avex Trax singles